The Manchester Silkworms were a collegiate summer baseball team located in Manchester, Connecticut playing in the New England Collegiate Baseball League, a collegiate summer baseball league operating in the northeastern United States region of New England. The team, an expansion franchise formed in 1999 which began play for the 2000 season, was based out of Northwest Park.  In October, 2009 a new ownership group announced they would be moving the team to Laconia, New Hampshire, becoming the Laconia Muskrats (now called the Winnipesaukee Muskrats).

History

Silkworm name
In 1838, the Cheney Family started what became the world's largest silk mill, and by the 1920s developed a utopian industrial community. The intact mill buildings, owner houses and worker houses are now a National Historic Landmark District. The mill buildings have undergone restoration and conversion to housing in the recent past.

Hence, the name Silkworms.

Move to Laconia
On Sunday, October 18, 2009, Silkworms founder, owner, and general manager Ed Slegeski announced that he had sold the team to a partnership led by Noah Crane, which moved the team to Laconia, New Hampshire for the 2010 NECBL season.

Notable former players

Jonah Bayliss, former Kansas City Royals and Pittsburgh Pirates pitcher
Nick Christiani, Cincinnati Reds pitcher
Chris Denorfia, San Diego Padres outfielder
Graham Godfrey, Pittsburgh Pirates pitcher
Reid Gorecki, former Atlanta Braves outfielder
Zach Jackson, Washington National pitcher
Ryan Lavarnway, Baltimore Orioles catcher
Andy Parrino, Oakland Athletics shortstop

Postseason appearances

See also
 New England Collegiate Baseball League
 Manchester, Connecticut

References

External links
 Manchester Silkworms website
 NECBL website

New England Collegiate Baseball League teams
Sports in Manchester, Connecticut
Amateur baseball teams in Connecticut
Silk